Portugal competed at the 1948 Summer Olympics in London, England. A delegation of forty eight competitors participated in eight sports, with an equestrian and sailing teams winning both a bronze and Portugal's first Olympic silver medal, respectively. This was also the first Olympics where this nation won more than one medal.

Medalists

Silver
 Duarte de Almeida Bello and Fernando Pinto Coelho Bello — Sailing, Swallow (Golondrina).

Bronze
 Fernando Paes, Francisco Valadas, Jr. and Luís Mena e Silva — Equestrian, Team Dressage.

Athletics

Men's 100m:
 J. Rodrigues de Morais — 1st round: 3rd (heat 11)

Men's 200m:
 J. Rodrigues de Morais — 1st round: 3rd (heat 3)

Men's Long Jump:
 A. Pereira Dias Cachulo — qualifiers

Men's Triple Jump:
 Luís Alcide de Nunes Garcia — qualifiers
 João Rodrigues Vieira — qualifiers

Equestrian

Men's Individual Dressage:
 Fernando Paes — 9th (411 points)
 Francisco Valadas, Jr. — 10th (405 points)
 Luís Mena e Silva — 12th (366 points)

Men's Team Dressage:
 Fernando Paes, Francisco Valadas, Jr. and Luís Mena e Silva — 3rd (1182 points)

Men's Individual Eventing:
 António Serôdio — eliminated
 Fernando Paes — 25th (167½ points)
 Fernando Marques Cavaleiro — 8th (55 points)

Men's Individual Jumping:
 Henrique Alves Calado — 18th (26 points)
 Hélder de Souza — eliminated
 J. Correia Barrento — 22nd (42½ points)

Men's Team Jumping:
 Henrique Alves Calado, Hélder de Souza and J. Correia Barrento — eliminated

Fencing

Six fencers, all men, represented Portugal in 1948.

Men's épée
 Álvaro Pinto — 1st round: 5th (poule 1)
 Emílio Lino — 1st round: 5th (poule 8)
 Manuel Chagas — 1st round: 7th (poule 2)

Men's team épée
 Álvaro Pinto, Carlos Dias, Emílio Lino, José Castro, Manuel Chagas and João Costa — 1st round: 3rd (poule 6)

Rowing

Portugal had 14 male rowers participate in two out of seven rowing events in 1948.

 Men's coxed four — 2nd round 2nd (heat 4)
 António Torres
 Delfim José da Silva
 José Joaquim Cancela
 José do Seixo
 Leonel Rêgo (cox)

 Men's eight — semi-final 2nd (heat 3)
 Felisberto Fortes
 Albino Simões Neto
 Carlos Roque
 João de Sousa
 João Alberto Lemos
 Carlos da Benta
 José Machado
 Ricardo da Benta
 Luís Machado (cox)

Sailing

Open

Shooting

Five shooters represented Portugal in 1948.

25 metre pistol
 Carlos Queiroz — 54th (489 points)
 José Maria Ferreira — 22nd (524 points)
 Moysés Cardoso — 55th (465 points)

50 metre pistol
 Moysés Cardoso — 42nd (485 points)
 Carlos Queiroz — 46th (482 points)

50 metre rifle
 Abílio Brandão — 57th (576 points)
 Carlos Queiroz — 63rd (572 points)
 José da Silva — 66th (570 points)

Swimming

Men's 100m backstroke:
 M. Alua Simas — 1st round: 5th (heat 3)

Art competitions

Officials
 César de Melo (chief of mission)
 Frederico Paredes (fencing)
 J. de A. Machado (fencing)
 F. Duarte (rowing)

References

External links
Official Olympic Reports
International Olympic Committee results database

Nations at the 1948 Summer Olympics
1948 Summer Olympics
1948 in Portuguese sport